Ottersøya is a village in Nærøysund municipality in Trøndelag county, Norway. The village is located at the southwestern end of the Kvingra peninsula, just across the Nærøysundet from the village of Rørvik. It is much closer to Rørvik (in Vikna) than to its own municipal centre, Kolvereid. The Marøysund Bridge and Nærøysund Bridge (which connect Nærøy to Vikna) lie just south of Ottersøya.

References

Villages in Trøndelag
Nærøysund
Nærøy